The Last Mughal: The Fall of a Dynasty, Delhi 1857 is a 2006 historical book by William Dalrymple.

Summary

The book, Dalrymple's sixth, and his second to reflect his long love affair with the city of Delhi, won praise for its use of "The Mutiny Papers", which included previously ignored Indian accounts of the events of 1857. He worked on these documents in association with the Urdu scholar Mahmood Farooqui.

Critical response
The book won the 2006 Duff Cooper Memorial Prize for History and Biography, and the 2007 Vodafone Crossword Book Award.

Geoffrey Moorhouse of The Guardian wrote,Dalrymple has here written an account of the Indian mutiny such as we have never had before, of the events leading up to it and of its aftermath, seen through the prism of the last emperor's life. He has vividly described the street life of the Mughal capital in the days before the catastrophe happened, he has put his finger deftly on every crucial point in the story, which earlier historians have sometimes missed, and he has supplied some of the most informative footnotes I have ever read. On top of that, he has splendidly conveyed the sheer joy of researching a piece of history, something every true historian knows, telling of his elation at discovering in Burma's national archives all Zafar's prison records, stored in Acrobat PDF files - "something the British Library has so far failed to achieve."Aamer Hussein of The Independent noted,Dalrymple's recreation of the city of Delhi under siege forms the monumental backdrop to the tragic figure of the eponymous monarch, the "last Mughal." Aged 82 and abidingly fond of the arts of peace, Bahadur Shah Zafar was chosen as a mascot by an army seen as rebels and mutineers by the British, and as freedom fighters by some nationalist historians.

References

External links
The Last Mughal - online read
Gresham College lecture by Dalrymple on The Last Mughal

2006 non-fiction books
Books about the Mughal Empire
History books about India
Books about British India
Books by William Dalrymple